Far from Erin's Isle is a 1912 American silent film directed by Sidney Olcott. It was one of more than a dozen films produced by the Kalem Company filmed in Ireland for American audiences. The film tells the story of a young girl who leaves Ireland for New York, but after losing two jobs and becoming sick, returns home where she is welcomed by her family and her sweetheart.

Cast
 Gene Gauntier - Kathleen
 Jack J. Clark - Brian
 Alice Hollister
 J. P. McGowan

Production notes
The film was shot in Beaufort, County Kerry, Ireland, and in New York during the summer of 1911.

References

Further reading
 Michel Derrien, Aux origines du cinéma irlandais: Sidney Olcott, le premier oeil, TIR 2013.

External links

 Far From Erin's Isle website dedicated to Sidney Olcott

1912 films
American silent short films
American black-and-white films
Films set in Ireland
Films shot in Ireland
Films directed by Sidney Olcott
Kalem Company films
1912 comedy-drama films
1910s English-language films
1910s American films
Comedy-drama short films
Silent American comedy-drama films